Shawn Joubert Zarraga (born January 21, 1989) is an Aruban former professional baseball catcher. He played for the Netherlands national baseball team in the 2015 WBSC Premier12 and 2017 World Baseball Classic.

Career

Milwaukee Brewers
Zarraga was drafted by the Milwaukee Brewers in the 44th round of the 2007 MLB Draft out of Trinity Christian Academy in Lake Worth, Florida. He began with the Arizona League Brewers in 2008 and then split 2009 between the Helena Brewers and Wisconsin Timber Rattlers. He was promoted to the Advanced-A Brevard County Manatees in 2010 and spent the next three seasons there before a 2013 promotion to the AA Huntsville Stars. In late 2014 he was promoted to the AAA Nashville Sounds.

Los Angeles Dodgers
On December 18, 2014, he was traded to the Los Angeles Dodgers in exchange for minor leaguers Jarret Martin and Matt Long. The Dodgers extended him an invitation to Major League spring training. Zarraga split 2015 between the AA Tulsa Drillers and AAA Oklahoma City Dodgers, hitting .286 in 62 games. In November 2015, he played for the Netherlands national baseball team in the WBSC Premier12.

The Dodgers purchased his contract from the minors and called him up to the majors on August 25, 2016. He returned to the minors the following day, without having appeared in a game. He was outrighted to the minors and removed from the 40-man roster on August 28. Zarraga's time on an MLB active roster, without ever appearing in an MLB game (to date), makes him a "phantom ballplayer". He played in 46 games between Tulsa and Oklahoma City in 2016, hitting .256. On November 7, 2016, Zarraga elected free agency.

Cincinnati Reds
On November 25, 2016, Zarraga signed a minor league contract with the Cincinnati Reds.

Cleburne Railroaders
On April 20, 2017, Zarraga signed with the Cleburne Railroaders of the American Association. Zarraga played in 41 games for Cleburne, slashing .272/.383/.397 with 3 home runs and 17 RBI.

Second Stint with Dodgers
On July 14, 2017, Zarraga signed a minor league contract with the Los Angeles Dodgers and finished the season with the Double-A Tulsa Drillers. On November 6, 2017, Zarraga elected free agency. On January 17, 2018. Zarraga re-signed with the Dodgers organization on a minor league contract. He was released on March 30, 2018.

Somerset Patriots
On August 31, 2018, Zarraga signed with the Somerset Patriots of the Atlantic League of Professional Baseball.

References

External links

1989 births
2015 WBSC Premier12 players
Arizona League Brewers players
Aruban expatriate baseball players in the United States
Brevard County Manatees players
Glendale Desert Dogs players
Helena Brewers players
Huntsville Stars players
Living people
Nashville Sounds players
Oklahoma City Dodgers players
Tulsa Drillers players
Wisconsin Timber Rattlers players
2017 World Baseball Classic players
People from Oranjestad, Aruba
Cleburne Railroaders players